ALF is an American television sitcom that aired on NBC from September 22, 1986, to March 24, 1990.

The title character, called ALF (an acronym for "Alien Life Form") but whose real name is Gordon Shumway, crash-lands in the garage of the suburban middle-class Tanner family. The series stars Max Wright as father Willie Tanner, Anne Schedeen as mother Kate Tanner and Andrea Elson and Benji Gregory as their children, Lynn and Brian Tanner. ALF was performed by puppeteer Paul Fusco, who co-created the show with Tom Patchett. However, in the scenes in which the character appeared in full body, a small costumed actor was briefly used (then uncredited in that role), the Hungarian-born Michu Meszaros.

Produced by Alien Productions, ALF ran for four seasons and produced 99 episodes, including three one-hour episodes ("Try to Remember", "ALF's Special Christmas" and "Tonight, Tonight") that were divided into two parts for syndication, totaling 102 episodes. The series proper concluded with an unresolved cliffhanger, but a later TV movie, Project: ALF, served as a series finale for the franchise.

In August 2018, Warner Bros. Television announced development of an ALF reboot. These plans were cancelled in November of that year. In February 2022, it was announced that Shout! Factory had acquired distribution rights to the ALF titles, and would "develop new ALF-related content."

Plot
Gordon Shumway is an alien from the planet Melmac who follows an amateur radio signal to Earth and crash-lands into the garage of the Tanners, a suburban middle-class family who live in the San Fernando Valley area of California. The family consists of social worker Willie (Max Wright), his wife Kate (Anne Schedeen), their teenage daughter Lynn (Andrea Elson), younger son Brian (Benji Gregory) and their pet cat Lucky (whom Gordon wishes to consume). Willie Tanner gives Gordon the nickname ALF ("Alien Life Form").

Unsure what to do, the Tanners take ALF into their home and hide him from the Alien Task Force (part of the U.S. military specializing in aliens) and their nosy neighbors Trevor and Raquel Ochmonek (John La Motta and Liz Sheridan), until ALF can repair his spacecraft. He generally hides in the kitchen. It is eventually revealed ALF's home planet Melmac exploded, due to nuclear war. In the season one episode "Pennsylvania 6-5000", ALF tries to convince the President of the United States to stop the nuclear program, as ALF fears Earth might suffer a fate similar to Melmac's, though miscalculating his words causes the President and national security to call the FBI to arrest Willie. ALF was off the planet when it was destroyed because he was part of the Melmac Orbit Guard. ALF is homeless, but is not the last survivor of his species. He becomes a permanent member of the family, although his culture shock, survivor guilt, general boredom, despair and loneliness frequently cause difficulty for the Tanners. Despite the problems and inconveniences his presence brings into their lives, they grow to love him, though some episodes make it clear they are also afraid of how their lives would be turned upside down if word got out he has been living with them.

While most of the science fiction of ALF was played for comedic value, there were a few references to actual topics in space exploration; for example, ALF uses a radio signal as a beacon in the pilot episode. In the episode "Weird Science", ALF tells Brian, who is building a model of the solar system for his science project, that there are two planets beyond Pluto called "Dave" and "Alvin" (as in David Seville and Alvin from the Alvin and the Chipmunks franchise), which gets Brian in trouble at school. However, after ALF makes a call to an astronomical organization and states that "Dave" is known by the organization, Willie comes to believe that "Dave" could be the planetoid Chiron or "Object Kowal". ALF then shows Willie exactly where "Dave" is on an intergalactic map of the universe.

Episodes dealt with ALF learning about Earth and making new friends both within and outside the Tanner family, including Willie's brother Neal (Jim J. Bullock), Kate's widowed mother Dorothy (Anne Meara) with whom ALF has a love-hate relationship, her boyfriend (and later husband) Whizzer (Paul Dooley), the Ochmoneks' nephew Jake (Josh Blake), a psychologist named Larry (Bill Daily) and a blind woman named Jody (Andrea Covell) who never figures out that ALF is not human (although she is aware through touch that he is short and hairy).

Changes occur within the Tanner household over the course of the series, including the birth of a new child, Eric (the reason for adding a baby in the series being that Anne Schedeen was pregnant at the time); ALF's move from his initial quarters in the laundry room to the attic, which he and Willie converted into an "apartment" and the death of Lucky in season four's "Live and Let Die"; in this instance, as ALF finds, despite his occasional attempts to catch Lucky with the intention of making the cat a meal, as cats are the equivalent of cattle on Melmac, he has come to love and respect the family pet too much to do anything untoward with Lucky's remains. When ALF acquires a new cat with the intent of eating it, he actually grows fond of it and allows it to be adopted by the family, although he admits to the Tanners he has become the worst kind of Melmackian, a "cat lover". In the 1996 movie Project ALF, which stars ALF after his capture by the USAF, the Tanners do not appear – they have relocated to Iceland.

Episodes

Cast

Main
 Paul Fusco – ALF (lead puppeteer, voice)
 Michu Meszaros – credited as one of ALF's assistants (in costume)
 Lisa Buckley – ALF (assistant puppeteer)
 Bob Fappiano – ALF (assistant puppeteer)
 Max Wright – Willie Tanner (Father)
 Anne Schedeen – Kate Tanner (Mother)
 Andrea Elson – Lynn Tanner (Daughter)
 Benji Gregory – Brian Tanner (Son)

Recurring
 Josh Blake – Jake Ochmonek (seasons 2–3)
 Jim J. Bullock – Neal Tanner (season 4)
 Andrea Covell – Jody
 Bill Daily – Dr. Larry Dykstra
 Paul Dooley – "Whizzer" Deaver
 John LaMotta – Trevor Ochmonek
 Anne Meara – Dorothy Halligan Deaver
 Charles Nickerson – Eric Tanner (season 4)
 Liz Sheridan – Raquel Ochmonek

Minor
 Eric Christmas – Bernie
 Mark Clayman - Randy
 Elisha Cook, Jr. – Uncle Albert
 Ricky Paull Goldin - Danny Duckworth
 Phillip Gordon – Luis
 Randee Heller – Elaine Ochmonek
 Keri Houlihan – Tiffany
 Phil Leeds – Jack
 Joseph Maher – Angel Bob
 David Ogden Stiers – Pete "Flaky" Finnegan
 Amzie Strickland – Rebecca
 Pete Willcox – Aaron King

Melmacians
 Lisa Buckley – Rhonda
 Bob Fappiano – Skipper "Skip" III
 Paul Fusco – Rick Fusterman
 Ellen-Ray Hennessy – Stella

Production

The series was videotaped at Century Studios, 8660 Hayden Place in Culver City California.

Producer Bernie Brillstein was approached to see Fusco's audition with a puppet character but was initially uninterested, having managed Jim Henson for years and regarding Henson as the best puppeteer in showbiz. However, Fusco's brief performance as ALF won over Brillstein, who thought the character was hilarious and strong enough to be the focus of a series.

Fusco co-produced the series with Tom Patchett. Patchett also co-created, wrote, and directed the series. The series was first syndicated by Warner Bros. Television and Lorimar-Telepictures. The US syndication rights were eventually passed over to Debmar-Mercury when its parent company, Lionsgate, owned home video rights. Now Shout! Factory controls all distribution rights to the series.

Due to the inherent nature of producing a show featuring hand-operated puppets (à la Jim Henson's The Muppet Show), ALF was technically difficult and extremely demanding on series creator Fusco as well as its four lead actors. All confirmed during a 2000 People magazine interview that there were constantly high levels of tension on the set. Max Wright stated that he despised supporting a technically demanding inanimate object that received most of the good lines of dialogue. He admitted to being "hugely eager to have ALF over with." Artie Lange, who later worked with Wright on The Norm Show, told of a time when Wright had become "crazed" and physically attacked ALF, causing producers to have to pull Wright off the puppet. Anne Schedeen said that on the last night of taping the final episode, "there was one take and Max walked off the set, went to his dressing room, got his bags, went to his car and disappeared... There were no goodbyes." Schedeen herself said "there was no joy on the set...it was a technical nightmare – extremely slow, hot and tedious... A 30-minute show took 20, 25 hours to shoot." While fond of her on-screen children, Schedeen said some adults had "difficult personalities. The whole thing was a big dysfunctional family." Schedeen added, "It's astonishing that ALF really was wonderful and that word never got out what a mess our set really was." Andrea Elson, who suffered from bulimia during the second season of shooting, stated, "If ALF had gone one more year, everybody would have lost it." Wright later admitted that as the years passed he looked back at ALF with less animosity and conceded that "It doesn't matter what I felt or what the days were like, ALF brought people a lot of joy." In reference to the tension, Fusco commented in 2012 that "It was just the nature of the beast. There was no way we could have made it go any further or any faster," he insisted. "I think it was frustrating that it would take so long, but people got paid for what they did. Despite what people thought, that there was a lot of tension on set, there really wasn't."

Fusco was notoriously secretive about his character up until the series' premiere. During the show's production, Fusco refused to acknowledge that the puppet ALF was anything other than an alien. All involved with the production were cautioned not to reveal any of ALF's production secrets.

The set was built on a platform raised four feet above the ground, with trap doors constructed at many points so that ALF could appear almost anywhere; Fusco operated him from underneath, so the unoccupied holes all over the floor were deep and treacherous. The trap doors had to be reset multiple times, sometimes during a single scene. Principal puppeteer Paul Fusco (who was mainly left-handed when puppeteering) used his left hand to control ALF's mouth, while his right hand controlled ALF's right arm. Another puppeteer, Lisa Buckley, who would go on to perform on Sesame Street, assisted Fusco beneath the stage, operating ALF's left arm. At times when ALF's full body was shown in the sitting position, Lisa controlled ALF's left hand by cable allowing slight finger movements. There was additionally a third puppeteer, Bob Fappiano, who controlled ALF's facial and ear movements via a radio control offscreen. During tapings, Fusco would wear a head-mounted microphone to record ALF's voice. The process resulted in numerous mistakes and retakes, making it impossible to record ALF in front of a live audience. A laugh track was added during post-production.

To avoid wear and tear on the principal ALF puppet, the performers rehearsed with a crude early version of ALF, nicknamed "RALF" For ("Rehearsal Alien Life Form"). Fusco did not like to rehearse, and would often substitute his hand or RALF for the real ALF puppet during rehearsals.

In an interview on Late Night with Conan O'Brien, Tina Fey said that her biggest frustration as producer of NBC's 75th-anniversary special was dealing with ALF's "people". Fey said Fusco would only allow ALF to appear on the show if the puppeteers were hidden from everyone else. After ALF's cameo alongside former Family Ties star Michael Gross, ALF disappeared through a hole in the riser, was stuffed into a case, and immediately removed from the building.

While a puppet was usually used for ALF, there were some shots of the tiny alien running or walking around. This was accomplished by the 2' 9" (84 cm) actor Michu Meszaros wearing an ALF costume. This can be seen in one of the series' intros, which concludes with the Tanner family getting their picture taken; ALF (played by Meszaros) walks over to be part of the photo. However, Meszaros' services became too costly as well as time-consuming, and the full ALF costume was abandoned after the first season.

ALF scored its highest ratings during Season 2 (reaching tenth place in the Nielsen ratings). Ratings remained at a steady fifteenth place during Season 3, but plummeted to 39th place during Season 4. NBC moved the show from its traditional Monday night slot to Saturday in March 1990 and eventually moved to Sunday, but ratings continued to fall.

The season-ending cliffhanger "Consider Me Gone" became an unintentional series finale when NBC gave Alien Productions a verbal commitment for a fifth season, but ultimately withdrew its support. ABC resolved the cliffhanger on February 17, 1996, with the TV movie Project: ALF. NBC executive Brandon Tartikoff later told Fusco that the network regretted cancelling ALF prematurely, saying "It was a big mistake that we cancelled your show, because you guys had at least one or two more seasons left."

Censorship

Fusco commented in 2007 that his most enjoyable experience on ALF was sitting in the Writers' Room and pitching jokes while pushing the limit as to what NBC censors would allow. Fusco commented that, "the greatest things were the jokes we couldn't put in the show." Specifically, puns dealing with ALF eating cats and other pets were problematic after NBC reported that a child placed a cat in a microwave after watching the show. In the pilot episode "A.L.F.", ALF is seen consuming a beer with Brian. Fusco defended the premise saying that "ALF is 285 years old, he can drink beer, he's old enough." However, as ALF became more popular with children, NBC told Fusco "you can't have him drinking; the kids are watching, it's a bad role model." Even though Fusco believed that ALF was "an adult: he can do it," the alcohol consumption concept was discarded by the end of the first season. with the exception of the episode "Varsity Drag" where he inspires an alcoholic to check into rehab after a night of drinking with her and making her think he was a hallucination. The cat-eating concept carried sporadically into the second season, with references including the "wedding cat" in the episode "Something's Wrong With Me," the Melmacian equivalent of a wedding cake.

For the hour-long season 1 episode, "Try to Remember," originally broadcast on February 9, 1987, ALF tries to simulate a jacuzzi by bringing Kate's electric mixer into the bathtub, thus receiving an electrical shock that caused amnesia. Fusco ended the original episode with a public service announcement from ALF himself, warning of the dangers of mixing water and electricity. Despite this, NBC reported that a child attempted to recreate the scenario and nearly electrocuted himself in the process (Fusco confirmed that the child was unharmed); Fusco was forced to refilm the opening sequence, replacing the electric mixer with a manual egg beater. ALF's amnesia is instead caused by a cranial concussion received after slipping in the shower (a "thud" is heard rather than a "zap"), with all mentions of being shocked either overdubbed with new dialogue or deleted entirely (including ALF's public service announcement). This edited version was used for a Fall 1988 rebroadcast, as well as all future U.S. and Canadian syndicated airings.

In 2010, blooper footage surfaced in which ALF was made to deliver racial jokes and sexual comments. He was actually mocking a then-recent episode of L.A. Law dealing with Tourette syndrome. Asked to comment, producer Steve Lamar stated that the footage was from an era when things were not so "ridiculously PC".

International broadcast history
In France, ALF aired on Antenne 2 in 1988.

ALF was very popular in Germany after it began airing on ZDF. The actor who dubbed ALF's voice in German, Tommi Piper, recorded two albums and four singles as ALF between 1988 and 1991.

In Italy, ALF aired on Rai 2 in 1988. In the United Kingdom it was broadcast on CITV.

Home media

United States and Canada
Between 2004 and 2006, Lionsgate Home Entertainment released all four seasons of ALF on DVD in Region 1. All releases contained syndicated versions, with running times of 21 minutes, compared to the original length of 24 minutes. Episodes are arranged in production order, rather than broadcast order. However, the 60-minute episodes "Try to Remember" and "ALF's Special Christmas" (from season one and season two, respectively), were presented in their original hour-long formats (though "Try to Remember" was presented in its censored version and "ALF's Special Christmas" has a minor scene using the song "Santa Claus Is Coming To Town" excised). The 60-minute episode "Tonight, Tonight", however, was split into two parts for syndication. The season four episode "Make 'Em Laugh" was presented in nearly its original length, with a single line of dialogue edited out.

The "To Be Continued..." disclaimer was also removed from the series finale, "Consider Me Gone", as NBC canceled ALF after its initial airing.

In addition, most copyrighted music was excised from selected shows, shortening the running time by up to six minutes. (The DVD release of The Odd Couple also suffered from this practice.)

Lionsgate insisted they had to utilize syndicated versions for the DVD release of ALF, saying it would be cost prohibitive to remaster the original NBC-TV broadcast versions for release. This resulted in heavy criticism.

Video Service Corporation previously released two other DVDs of ALF. The ALF Files was released exclusively in Canada on November 1, 2002. The hour-long episodes "Try to Remember", "ALF's Special Christmas" and "Tonight, Tonight" were presented in their original hour-long format. "Try to Remember", however, contains the re-edited version pertaining to ALF's electric shock in the bathtub.

On September 13, 2005, Project: ALF was released. Both DVDs featured optional commentary by creator Paul Fusco, with co-creator Tom Patchett joining him on the first release.

On February 24, 2022, it was announced that Shout! Factory acquired the distribution rights to the series.

The first two seasons of ALF now  appear on Amazon Prime Canada.

Europe
Warner Home Video released the first season of ALF in Germany on September 4, 2009, and in the Netherlands and France on September 9. The DVDs are in PAL format, with English-language menus. The language selections available are English, French, German and Spanish (except for season 2 which, despite being dubbed, oddly doesn't feature Spanish, and the episode "Tonight, Tonight" which had not dubbed into German), with subtitles available in French, Dutch, Spanish, English and German. The series was released on HBO Max in April 26, 2022 in Spain and July 12, 2022 in Nordics and Portugal.

The episodes span four discs and are complete, unlike their American edited counterparts, with a few exceptions:
 A scene from "For Your Eyes Only" where ALF and friend Jody are singing "Ragtime Cowboy Joe" and "The Chipmunk Song (Christmas Don't Be Late)" by Alvin and the Chipmunks was removed because of music copyright issues with Bagdasarian Productions, owners of the Chipmunks franchise.
 The censored version of "Try to Remember" was utilized, removing the mention of electrocution.
 The syndicated version of "Somewhere Over the Rerun" (a.k.a. "The Ballad of Gilligan's Island") was utilized, though the Gilligan's Island theme was retained.
 The series finale "Consider Me Gone" retained the "To Be Continued..." caption seen during its original March 1990 broadcast.

Oceania
In Region 4, Warner Home Video released the first two seasons of ALF on DVD in Australia and New Zealand on April 7, 2010. Seasons 3 and 4 have yet to get released in Region 4.

Latin America

Since December 22, 2021, ALF is available on HBO Max.

Awards
In the U.S., ALF has won numerous awards. In 1987, the show won a People's Choice Award for Favorite New TV Comedy Program; in 1988 it won Favorite Show at the Kids' Choice Awards; and at the 1989 Kids' Choice Awards, ALF himself won Favorite TV Actor. Benji Gregory and Andrea Elson were also nominated in various Young Actor categories for their work on ALF at the Young Artist Awards during 1987–1989, with the show also receiving a nomination for Best Family Television Series.

Syndication
Reruns of ALF entered off-network syndication in September 1990 when NBC replaced it with The Fresh Prince of Bel-Air. Repeats of the show debuted on cable in 1999 on the Odyssey Network, remaining on the schedule after Hallmark took full control and airing until 2002. It also ran on Nick at Nite for a short time in 2001, and aired on the Hub Network from 2012 to 2014. On January 2, the show would start airing on Laff.

International broadcast
In the Philippines, the show aired on GMA Network with a simulcast on ABS-CBN and RPN-9 from 1986-1990. It moved to ABC-5, where it aired while dubbed in Tagalog from 1999-2002.

Spinoffs and related programming

Animated series

To capitalize on the success of the series, a spin-off animated series was produced, airing Saturday mornings on NBC. ALF: The Animated Series, set on ALF's home planet of Melmac, ran from 1987 to 1988 and was produced by DIC Entertainment. This was a prequel series, set on Melmac before the planet exploded. The show focused on ALF, his family, his friends, and girlfriend Rhonda and their various exploits. Each episode was book-ended by a live-action sequence involving ALF talking to the television viewers, setting up the episode and commenting on it afterward. When the cartoon entered its second season, it was paired in a one-hour block with its own spin-off ALF Tales, which took Gordon and the cast of characters from season one, and recast them as characters from assorted classic fairy tales.

Select episodes of both shows are included as special features on the ALF: Season 2 DVD as well as the cartoon-specific releases ALF Animated Adventures – 20,000 Years in Driving School and Other Stories and ALF and The Beanstalk and Other Classic Fairy Tales.

The animated version of ALF also appeared in Cartoon All-Stars to the Rescue.

ALF's Hit Talk Show
In 2004, ALF's Hit Talk Show debuted on U.S. cable channel TV Land, which featured ALF as a Johnny Carson-type TV talk-show host and co-starring Ed McMahon as his sidekick. Guests included Drew Carey, Tom Green, and Merv Griffin. It ran for seven episodes.

Films
Following the end of the series a made-for-television movie was produced, in 1996, intending to give the series a proper end. Project: ALF starts right after the series final episode but, especially because of the absence of the Tanners, it failed at obtaining success.

On May 21, 2012, Paul Fusco said he was pitching an ALF movie. In August 2012, it was reported that Sony Pictures Animation had acquired the rights to ALF and would develop the property into a CGI-Live action hybrid feature. The Smurfs producer Jordan Kerner, would also produce the film, along with Tom Patchett and Paul Fusco.

Cancelled reboot
On August 1, 2018, it was announced that Warner Bros. would produce an ALF reboot. The reboot would have likely focused on ALF returning to Earth, with a new family and characters. In November 2018, it was reported that the reboot was cancelled.

In other media

See also 

 Project: ALF (1996), a TV movie that begins where the final episode of ALF ended
 3rd Rock from the Sun (1996)
 Mork & Mindy (1978)
 Resident Alien (2021)

References

External links

ALF on Twitch

 
1986 American television series debuts
1990 American television series endings
1980s American comic science fiction television series
1990s American comic science fiction television series
1980s American sitcoms
1990s American sitcoms
American television shows featuring puppetry
English-language television shows
NBC original programming
Star Comics titles
Television series about alien visitations
Television series about extraterrestrial life
Television series about families
Television series by Lionsgate Television
Television series by Lorimar-Telepictures
Television series by Lorimar Television
Television series by Warner Bros. Television Studios
Television series created by Paul Fusco
Television series created by Tom Patchett
Television shows adapted into comics
Television shows adapted into video games
Television shows set in Los Angeles